Frosé is a mixed drink made from rosé wine frozen to a slush, with strawberries, vodka, and lemon juice.

History
The Bar Primi in New York City is credited with inventing the drink, its name being contracted from "frozen rosé". It has since become popular as a summer drink across the US.

Preparation
The rose wine is generally frozen and then ground in a blender, or made into a slush in a machine. Sugar is then added as a syrup or dissolved in water, strawberry without seeds or pulp, and lemon juice, blended together.

Variations
 Watermelon frosé
 Mango frosé

References

mixed drinks